Danson Namasaka Chetambe (born 25 August 1995) is a Kenyan footballer who plays as a central midfielder for Bandari and the Kenya national football team.

Club career
Chetambe grew up in Teso, Busia County. He played youth football for Firm United before playing senior football with Border Lions, Busia United and Zoo Kericho. He won promotion with Zoo to the Kenyan Premier League in 2017.

In June 2019, Chetambe signed for Bandari, with himself stating that he wished to "help the team win titles this season".

International career
He received his first call-up to the Kenya national football team in March 2021. He made his debut for Kenya on 13 March 2021 in a match against South Sudan and provided the assist for the only goal of the game as Kenya won 1–0.

Style of play
Chetambe plays as a central midfielder and has been described as a playmaker.

Personal life
He is the older brother of fellow footballers Edwin and Erick Nakamasaka.

References

External links

1995 births
Living people
Kenyan footballers
Kenya international footballers
Association football midfielders
Bandari F.C. (Kenya) players
Kenyan Premier League players
People from Busia County